Dracaena afromontana is a species of flowering plant in the family Asparagaceae, native to the highlands of eastern tropical Africa; South Sudan (Imatong Mountains), Ethiopia, the Democratic Republic of the Congo, Rwanda, Burundi, Uganda, Kenya, Tanzania, and Malawi. It is used as a street tree in Kigali, Rwanda.

References

afromontana
Flora of South Sudan
Flora of the Democratic Republic of the Congo
Flora of Rwanda
Flora of Burundi
Flora of East Tropical Africa
Flora of Malawi
Plants described in 1910